Alison Joy Downard is a New Zealand academic, and has been a full professor at the University of Canterbury since 2009. Her work focuses on surface chemistry, electrochemistry and nanoscale grafted layers.

Academic career 
After a PhD titled Electron transfer reactions of organometallic clusters at the University of Otago, Downard moved to the University of Southampton, followed by a two-year postdoctoral associate position at UNC Chapel Hill from 1986. In 1988, she moved to the University of Canterbury, rising to full professor in 2009.

In 2017, Downard was featured as one of the Royal Society Te Apārangi's 150 women in 150 words.

Downard works as part of the MacDiarmid Institute for Advanced Materials and Nanotechnology. Downard's research on chemical modifications to surfaces at the nanoscale has enabled new electrodes to be discovered. Her findings have implications for energy storage.

Awards 
In 2014, Downard was awarded the R. H. Stokes medal by the Royal Australian Chemical Institute. The same year she was elected as a Fellow of the Royal Society Te Apārangi, and received an honorary doctorate from the University of Rennes 1.

Selected works

References

External links

 

Living people
Year of birth missing (living people)
University of Otago alumni
Academic staff of the University of Canterbury
New Zealand women academics
New Zealand chemists
Fellows of the Royal Society of New Zealand